The Milwaukee Railroad Depot in Alberton, Montana was built by the Chicago, Milwaukee, St. Paul and Pacific Railroad (a.k.a. Milwaukee Road) in 1908, during its Pacific Extension from Chicago, Illinois to Tacoma, Washington from 1906 to 1909. The depot is a rectangular one-story wood-frame building constructed in the Craftsman style.

When the Milwaukee Road built its transcontinental line, it placed a division point at Alberton. In addition to the depot, there were also a roundhouse, turntable and locomotive repair shops. The depot became the center of the commercial district of the town and the railroad was the town's major employer.

When the railroad was electrified in the 1920s, the roundhouse and turntable were removed.

When the railroad went bankrupt in the 1980s, the depot was sold to the Town of Alberton and is now used as a community center.

The depot was listed in the National Register because of its architecture and association with The Milwaukee Road and the development of railroads in Montana.

Notes

References
Historical Research Associates. . National Register of Historic Places Multiple Property Documentation Form, 1997. On file at the National Park Service, Washington, D.C.
McDonald, James R. Milwaukee Railroad Depot (Mineral County, Montana). National Register of Historic Places Registration Form, 1997. On file at the National Park Service, Washington, D.C.

Railway stations on the National Register of Historic Places in Montana
Alberton, Montana
Railway stations in the United States opened in 1908
National Register of Historic Places in Mineral County, Montana
1908 establishments in Montana
Former railway stations in Montana
American Craftsman architecture in Montana
Transportation in Mineral County, Montana